Jargal (happiness,  is a common part of Mongolian names, signifying:

People
 Rinchinnyamyn Amarjargal, a former prime minister of Mongolia 
 Pürevjargalyn Lkhamdegd, a Mongolian olympic judoka

Places
 Jargalant khot, a former official name for Khovd city
 Mönkhkhairkhan Mountain, a mountain in Khovd Province, Mongolia
 several sums (districts) in different aimags (provinces) of Mongolia:
 Jargalant, Khovd
 Jargalant, Arkhangai
 Jargalant, Bayankhongor
 Dalanjargalan, Dornogovi
 Bayanjargalan, Dundgovi
 Jargalan, Govi-Altai
 Jargaltkhaan, Khentii
 Jargalant, Khövsgöl
 Jargalant, Orkhon
 Bayanjargalan, Töv
 Jargalant, Töv

See also 

 etymologically unrelated, a novel by Victor Hugo, see Bug-Jargal